Mambai, also called Mambae or Manbae, is a language spoken by the Mambai people, the second largest ethnic group in the island country of East Timor.

Geographic distribution 
Mambai is one of 15 constitutionally recognized national languages. The main centers of Mambai are Ermera, Aileu, Remexio, Turiscai, Maubisse Administrative Post, Ainaro Administrative Post and Same Administrative Post. The majority of the Timorese community in Australia is native in Mambai.

Mambai used to be spoken in the area around Dili, when the Portuguese declared the city to be the capital of their colony Portuguese Timor. Therefore, the Tetum Prasa spoken in Dili is still exhibiting strong influences from its Mambai substrate.

Phonology

Consonants 

  can also be heard as aspirated .
  is also heard as a voiced post-alveolar stop .
  is slightly aspirated  before mid and low vowels.  can also have an allophone  when preceding high vowels.
 The plosives  are unreleased  in word-final position.

Vowels 

  can also have shortened allophones .

Dialects 
Mambae can be divided into three dialects according to Fogaça (2017):
Northwest
Liquiça: Bazartete
Ermera: Hatulia
Ermera: Railaco

Northeast-Central
Aileu: Laulara
Aileu: Vila Grupo
Aileu: Liquidoe
Ainaro: Hatu-Builico

South
Ainaro: Hato-Udo 
Manufahi-Same: Letefoho
Manufahi-Same: Betano

Examples of dialectal variation in Mambae:

Comparison of selected body part words in Mambae dialects:

{| class="wikitable sortable"
! gloss !! Liquiça (Bazartete) !! Ermera (Hatulia) !! Ermera (Railaco) !! Aileu (Laulara) !! Aileu (Vila Grupo) !! Aileu (Liquidoe) !! Ainaro (Hatu-Builico) !! Ainaro (Hato-Udo) !! Manufahi-Same (Letefoho) !! Manufahi-Same (Betano)
|-
| mouth ||  ||  ||  ||  ||  ||  ||  ||  ||  || 
|-
| arm ||  ||  ||  ||  ||  ||  ||  ||  ||  || 
|-
| elbow ||  ||  ||  ||  ||  ||  ||  ||  ||  || 
|-
| shoulder ||  ||  ||  ||  ||  ||  ||  ||  ||  || 
|-
| head ||  ||  ||  ||  ||  ||  ||  ||  ||  || 
|-
| headache ||  ||  ||  ||  ||  ||  ||  ||  ||  || 
|-
| hair ||  ||  ||  ||  ||  ||  ||  ||  ||  || 
|-
| black hair ||  ||  ||  ||  ||  ||  ||  ||  ||  || 
|-
| flesh (human) ||  ||  ||  ||  ||  ||  ||  ||  ||  || 
|-
| heart ||  ||  ||  ||  ||  ||  ||  ||  ||  || 
|-
| back ||  ||  ||  ||  ||  ||  ||  ||  ||  || 
|-
| tooth ||  ||  ||  ||  ||  ||  ||  ||  ||  || 
|-
| finger ||  ||  ||  ||  ||  ||  ||  ||  ||  || 
|-
| liver ||  ||  ||  ||  ||  ||  ||  ||  ||  || 
|-
| tongue ||  ||  ||  ||  ||  ||  ||  ||  ||  || 
|-
| hand ||  ||  ||  ||  ||  ||  ||  ||  ||  || 
|-
| nose ||  ||  ||  ||  ||  ||  ||  ||  ||  || 
|-
| eye ||  ||  ||  ||  ||  ||  ||  ||  ||  || 
|-
| ear ||  ||  ||  ||  ||  ||  ||  ||  ||  || 
|-
| bone ||  ||  ||  ||  ||  ||  ||  ||  ||  || 
|-
| foot ||  ||  ||  ||  ||  ||  ||  ||  ||  || 
|-
| skin ||  ||  ||  ||  ||  ||  ||  ||  ||  || 
|-
| leg ||  ||  ||  ||  ||  ||  ||  ||  ||  || 
|-
| neck ||  ||  ||  ||  ||  ||  ||  ||  ||  || 
|-
| blood ||  ||  ||  ||  ||  ||  ||  ||  ||  || 
|}

References

Further reading 
 Geoffrey Hull, Celestino de Araújo, and Benjamim de Araújo e Corte-Real, Mambai Language Manual: Ainaro dialect, Sebastião Aparício da Silva Project, 2001.
 Alexandra Y. Aikhenvald and Robert M. W. Dixon (eds), Grammars in contact: a cross-linguistic typology, Oxford University Press, 2006, Chapter 6.

External links 
 John 8,1-11 in Mambai
 Kaipuleohone's materials include Robert Blust's written notes on Mambai

Languages of East Timor
Timor–Babar languages